WCER may refer to:

 WCER (AM), a defunct radio station (900 AM) formerly licensed to serve Canton, Ohio, USA
 World Congress of Ethnic Religions
 Wisconsin Center for Education Research